Thomas Peterson (born December 24, 1986) is an American former professional road racing cyclist who last rode for UCI ProTeam . Peterson is a domestique. A resident of Bellevue, Washington, Peterson owns the Peterson Bike Shop in Renton, Washington, United States.


Career achievements

Major results
Sources:

2004
 1st  National Junior Road Race Championships
2005
 3rd Overall Tour de Taiwan
2006
 1st  Youth classification Tour of California
 6th National Under-23 Road Race Championships
2007
 1st Stage 3 Tour of the Gila
2008
 3rd National Under-23 Road Race Championships
 4th Overall Vuelta Chihuahua Internacional
 7th Overall Tour of the Bahamas
2009
 1st  Mountains classification Herald Sun Tour
 1st Stage 2 Tour of California
 8th Overall Bayern Rundfahrt
 10th Overall Tour of Austria
2011
 4th Overall Tour of Turkey

Grand Tour general classification timeline

References

External links

Cycling Base: Thomas Peterson
Cycling Quotient: Thomas Peterson
Giant-Shimano: Tom Peterson

1986 births
Living people
American male cyclists
Cyclists from Washington (state)
People from Everett, Washington
Sportspeople from Bellevue, Washington